Koozh is the Tamil name for a porridge made from millet. It is one of the traditional food in villages of  Tamil Nadu.

In Tamil Nadu and other places, koozh is consumed as breakfast or lunch. Koozh is made from Kezhvaragu or Cumbu flour and broken rice (called  in Tamil) in a clay pot. Koozh is a vegetarian recipe though there are non-vegetarian koozh made from fish, crab and chicken, it is commonly consumed by the villagers of Tamil Nadu. Koozh is usually made in large batches and gives a sour tang flavor if fermented. The semi-solid koozh is later liquefied for consumption by adding water and salt and, optionally, buttermilk, onion, curry leaves and coriander leaves. It is served with side dishes including green chilis, raw onion, pickles and mango spiced with red chili pepper and sometimes with Karuvattu Kozhambu meaning Dry Fish Gravy. The microbes present in koozh demonstrated their probiotic nature in vitro. When compared to other similar genetic sequences, strains were from fermented foods, agriculture, livestock and feces widely distributed in Eurasia.

Koozh without fermentation is served hot often consumed at Mariamman temple festivals across rural Tamil Nadu. It is made in Large Quantities and served to Public in Amman Temples across the city in Lieu of Aadi Thiruvizha which takes place during the Tamil Month Aadi.

See also
 List of porridges

References 
Study throws light on koozh as street food
Koozh and Hinduism

Tamil cuisine
Porridges